
Kendrick is a surname, sometimes used as a masculine given name, which may originate from:

The Welsh name Cynwrig meaning "greatest champion", or
The Anglo-Saxon name Cyneric meaning cyne (royal, of a king) + rīks (king, ruler).
The Highland Scots surname Machendrie, frequently anglicized into Kendrick and MacKendrick

Notable people with the name include:

Surname 
Alex Kendrick (born 1970), pastor, screenwriter, director and actor
Anna Kendrick (born 1985), American actress
Asahel C. Kendrick (1809–1895), American classicist, grammarian and exegete
Brian Kendrick (born 1979), American professional wrestler
Derion Kendrick (born 2000), American football player
Donald M. Kendrick (born 1947), Canadian choirmaster
Eddie Kendricks (1939–1992), Motown recording artist and founding member of The Temptations
Ella B. Kendrick (1849–1928), American temperance activist
Ellie Kendrick (born 1990), British actress
Fiona Kendrick (born 1955), chairman and CEO of Nestlé UK & Ireland
Flora Kendrick (1880–1969), British artist
George Prentiss Kendrick, American artist
Graham Kendrick (born 1950), British Christian singer-songwriter
Helen Kendrick Johnson (1844–1917), American anti-suffragist activist and writer
Howie Kendrick (born 1983), American baseball player for the Washington Nationals
John Kendrick (disambiguation), multiple people
Ken Kendrick (born 1943), American businessman and principal owner/managing general partner of Arizona Diamondbacks
Kyle Kendrick (born 1984), American baseball pitcher in the Boston Red Sox organization
Nancy Kendrick, American philosopher
Rhonda Ross Kendrick (born 1971), American actress
Rob Kendrick, British guitarist
Robert Kendrick (born 1979), American tennis player
Rodney Kendrick (born 1960) American jazz pianist 
Stephen Kendrick, pastor, screenwriter and producer
Thomas Kendrick (agent) (1881–1972) British intelligence agent
T. D. Kendrick (Sir Thomas Downing Kendrick, 1895–1979), archaeologist and Director of the British Museum
W. Freeland Kendrick, mayor of Philadelphia (1924–1928)
William Kenrick (writer) (1725?–1779), an English novelist, playwright, translator and satirist

Given name 
Kendrick Frazier (1942-2022), American science writer
Kendrick Green (born 1998), American football player
Kendrick Lamar (born 1987), American rapper
Kendrick Norton (born 1997), American football player
Kendrick Nunn (born 1995), American basketball player
Kendrick Office (born 1978), American football player
Kendrick Perkins (born 1984), American basketball player
Kendrick Scott (born 1980), American jazz drummer and bandleader
Kendrick Taylor (born 1957), American scientist

See also
Clan Henderson, a Scottish clan for which Kendrick is an Anglicized sept
Kendricks, a surname

References

Clan Henderson
English masculine given names
English-language surnames